Sadak is a surname. Notable people with the surname are as follows:

 John Sadak (born 1979), American television and radio sports announcer
 Necmettin Sadak (1890–1953), Turkish politician
 Selim Sadak (born 1954), Turkish Kurdish politician

Surnames of Turkish origin